Thomas William Ward (1853 – 3 February 1926) was a scrap metal merchant and shipbreaker from Sheffield, England, most famous for the establishment of his company Thos. W. Ward Limited (Company No. 81020), and its First World War-era "employee" Lizzie the Elephant.

Life
Thomas William Ward was born in Sheffield, England in 1853, and began work as at the age of 15 as a coal merchant. He was soon drawn into Sheffield's famous steel industry and became a successful scrap metal dealer in the city, helped by the great demand for the product during the early 1870s. Ward became an expert at dismantling big structures, and rose to considerable fame as a skilled shipbreaker and tradesman with his company Thos. W. Ward Ltd, established in 1873 and formed into a Limited Company at the Albion Works in Sheffield in 1904. He owned breakers' yards at ports around Britain, and was well known for his resourceful nature, recycling everything on the warships and redundant luxury liners given over to his care, down to lamps and carpets, even the timber being used for garden furniture. Some of his most famous shipbreaking projects included the  White Star Liner from the early 1900s, which was broken up at his yard near Morecambe in 1914 and the Olympic, which was finally towed to Inverkeithing.

Thomas Ward was elected to the prestigious office of Master Cutler in 1913 and his brother Joseph became Chairman of the Scrap Advisory Committee to the Ministry of Munitions.

Ward died on 3 February 1926 and was buried at Crookes Cemetery, Headland Road, Sheffield.

After his death Thos. W. Ward Ltd was able to survive throughout the Second World War and was run by Ward's family until the latter part of the 1950s. In January 1982 the company was taken over by Rio Tinto Zinc.

See also
List of people from Sheffield

References 

British metallurgists
Master Cutlers
1853 births
1926 deaths